Mustafa Mit (born 1 January 1950) is a Turkish politician from the Nationalist Movement Party (MHP), who  currently serves as a Member of Parliament for Ankara's second electoral district since 7 June 2015.

Biography 
Mustafa Mit was born in Şarkışla, Sivas Province. He completed his primary, secondary and high school education in different parts of Anatolia before graduating from Gazi University Faculty of economics and administrative sciences.

References 

1950 births
Living people
People from Şarkışla
Nationalist Movement Party politicians